Kenneth Joseph Holliday (19 August 1925 – 1 February 1999) is an English retired professional footballer who played as a defender in the Football League.

References

1925 births
1999 deaths
People from Darwen
English footballers
Darwen F.C. players
Accrington Stanley F.C. (1891) players
Blackburn Rovers F.C. players
Barrow A.F.C. players
Nelson F.C. players
English Football League players
Association football defenders